Kataragama may mean:
Kataragama, a pilgrimage town in Sri Lanka 
Kataragama temple, a temple complex in Sri Lanka to Skanda-Murkan, a Hindu deity; or Kataragamadevio a Buddhist deity 
Sella Kataragama, a shrine dedicated to Ganesha in Sri Lanka
Kataragama deviyo, a Hindu or Buddhist god worshipped at Kataragama
Kataragama Peak, a mountain near Kataragama, Sri Lanka